Cássio Pereira (born 7 December 1971) is a Brazilian volleyball player. He competed in the men's tournament at the 1996 Summer Olympics.

References

1971 births
Living people
Brazilian men's volleyball players
Olympic volleyball players of Brazil
Volleyball players at the 1996 Summer Olympics
Volleyball players from Rio de Janeiro (city)